Southeast USD 247 is a public unified school district headquartered in Cherokee, Kansas, United States.  The district includes the communities of Cherokee, McCune, Sherman, Weir, West Mineral, and nearby rural areas.

Schools
The school district operates the following schools:
 Southeast High School
 Southeast Middle School
 Southeast Elementary School

History
In 2007, Cherokee USD 247 was renamed to Southeast USD 247.

See also
 Kansas State Department of Education
 Kansas State High School Activities Association
 List of high schools in Kansas
 List of unified school districts in Kansas

References

External links
 

School districts in Kansas
School districts established in 2007
2007 establishments in Kansas